Ernesto Sauter (10 July 1905 – 6 April 1984) was a Brazilian rower. He competed in the men's eight event at the 1936 Summer Olympics.

References

External links
 

1905 births
1984 deaths
Brazilian male rowers
Olympic rowers of Brazil
Rowers at the 1936 Summer Olympics
Sportspeople from Rio Grande do Sul